Song Ligang (born June 8, 1967 in Tianjin) is a former Chinese basketball player. He competed at 1992 Barcelona Olympic Games, and was the flagbearer of Chinese Olympic Team at the opening ceremony.

He also competed for his native country at the 1988 Summer Olympics. Song currently serves as an officer in Hainan government.

External links
 sports-reference

1967 births
Living people
Basketball players at the 1988 Summer Olympics
Basketball players at the 1992 Summer Olympics
Chinese men's basketball players
1990 FIBA World Championship players
Olympic basketball players of China
Basketball players from Tianjin
Asian Games medalists in basketball
Basketball players at the 1990 Asian Games
Asian Games gold medalists for China
Medalists at the 1990 Asian Games